The function of Parliamentary Secretary in Canada was created 14 May 1963. They are not members of the Cabinet, nor the ministry.

Nineteenth Canadian ministry 
 Parliamentary Secretary to the Prime Minister
 16 July 1965 – 8 September 1965: Jean Chrétien
 Parliamentary Secretary to the Minister of Finance
 7 January 1966 – 3 April 1967: Jean Chrétien
 Parliamentary Secretary to the Minister of Indian Affairs and Northern Development
 1 October 1966 – 20 April 1968: Stanley Haidasz
 Parliamentary Secretary to the Minister of National Health and Welfare
 14 May 1963 – 19 February 1964: Stanley Haidasz
 Parliamentary Secretary to the Minister of Northern Affairs and National Resources
 7 January 1966 – 30 September 1966: Stanley Haidasz
 Parliamentary Secretary to the Minister of Public Works
 1 October 1966 – 20 April 1968: John Benjamin Stewart
 Parliamentary Secretary to the Secretary of State for External Affairs
 14 May 1963 – 19 February 1964: John Benjamin Stewart
 20 February 1964 – 8 September 1965: Stanley Haidasz
 Parliamentary Secretary to the Secretary of State of Canada
 20 February 1964 – 8 September 1965: John Benjamin Stewart

Twentieth Canadian ministry 
 Parliamentary Secretary to the Minister of Consumer and Corporate Affairs
 30 August 1968 – 19 October 1969: Stanley Haidasz
 1 October 1974 – 9 May 1974: Pierre De Bané
 1 October 1978 – 26 March 1979: Aideen Nicholson
 Parliamentary Secretary to the Minister of the Environment
 11 June 1971 – 1 September 1972: Eymard Georges Corbin
 22 December 1972 – 21 December 1973: William H. Rompkey
 1 January 1974 – 9 May 1974: William H. Rompkey
 10 October 1975 – 30 September 1976: George S. Baker
 Parliamentary Secretary to the Minister of Finance
 30 August 1968 – 19 October 1969: Herbert Eser Gray
 Parliamentary Secretary to the Minister of Fisheries
 30 August 1968 – 31 March 1969: Eugene Francis Whelan
 Parliamentary Secretary to the Minister of Fisheries and Forestry
 1 August 1969 – 30 September 1970: Eugene Francis Whelan
 1 October 1970 – 10 June 1971: Eymard Georges Corbin
 Parliamentary Secretary to the Minister of Indian Affairs and Northern Development
 20 April 1968 – 23 April 1968: Stanley Haidasz
 Parliamentary Secretary to the Minister of Justice and Attorney General of Canada
 10 October 1975 – 13 September 1976: Francis Fox
 Parliamentary Secretary to the Minister of Labour
 1 October 1970 – 2 February 1972: Raymond Joseph Perrault
 1 October 1978 – 26 March 1979: Dennis Dawson
 Parliamentary Secretary to the Minister of Manpower and Immigration
 1 October 1970 – 30 September 1971: Charles L. Caccia
 1 October 1971 – 2 February 1972: Marcel Prud'Homme
 3 February 1972 – 1 September 1972: Raymond Joseph Perrault
 15 September 1974 – 14 September 1975: William H. Rompkey
 Parliamentary Secretary to the Minister of National Defence
 22 December 1972 – 21 December 1973: Leonard Donald Hopkins
 Parliamentary Secretary to the Minister of National Health and Welfare
 20 October 1969 – 30 September 1970: Stanley Haidasz
 Parliamentary Secretary to the Minister of National Revenue
 1 October 1976 – 30 September 1977: George S. Baker
 Parliamentary Secretary to the Minister of Public Works
 20 April 1968 – 23 April 1968: John Benjamin Stewart
 Parliamentary Secretary to the Minister of Regional Economic Expansion
 22 Décember 1972 – 21 Décembre 1973: Marcel Prud'Homme
 1 January 1974 – 9 May 1974: Marcel Prud'Homme
 Parliamentary Secretary to the Minister of Supplies and Services
 1 October 1977 – 30 September 1978: Aideen Nicholson
 Parliamentary Secretary to the Minister of Transport
 10 October 1975 – 30 September 1976: Ralph Edward Goodale
 Parliamentary Secretary to the Minister of Veterans Affairs
 1 October 1977 – 26 March 1979: Gilbert Parent
 Parliamentary Secretary to the Minister of State for Urban Affairs
 15 September 1974 – 14 September 1975: Pierre De Bané
 10 October 1975 – 30 September 1977: Jean-Robert Gauthier
 Parliamentary Secretary to the Postmaster General
 1 October 1978 – 26 March 1979: David Michael Collenette
 Parliamentary Secretary to the President of the Privy Council
 1 October 1976 – 30 September 1977: Ralph Edward Goodale
 Parliamentary Secretary to the President of the Treasury Board
 5 March 1970 – 30 September 1970: Charles L. Caccia
 Parliamentary Secretary to the Secretary of State for External Affairs
 22 December 1972 – 21 December 1973: Pierre De Bané
 Parliamentary Secretary to the Secretary of State of Canada
 3 February 1972 – 1 September 1972: Marcel Prud'Homme
 Parliamentary Secretary to the Solicitor General of Canada
 20 October 1969 – 4 March 1970: Charles L. Caccia

Twenty-First Canadian ministry 
 Parliamentary Secretary to the President of the Privy Council
 1 October 1979 – 14 December 1979: David Kilgour

Twenty-Second Canadian ministry 
 Parliamentary Secretary to the Minister of Communications
 4 March 1980 – 1 July 1981: Peter Alan Stollery
 Parliamentary Secretary to the Minister of Consumer and Corporate Affairs 
 4 March 1980 – 30 September 1980 Aideen Nicholson
 Parliamentary Secretary to the Minister of Employment and Immigration
 4 March 1980 – 30 September 1981: Dennis Dawson
 Parliamentary Secretary to the Minister of Energy, Mines and Resources
 1 March 1982 – 29 February 1984: David Charles Dingwall
 1 March 1984 – 29 June 1984: Leonard Donald Hopkins
 Parliamentary Secretary to the Minister of the Environment
 4 March 1980 – 30 September 1982: Roger Simmons
 Parliamentary Secretary to the Minister of Fisheries and Oceans
 1 October 1981 – 29 February 1984: Brian Tobin
 Parliamentary Secretary to the Minister of Justice and Attorney General of Canada
 1 October 1981 – 30 September 1982: James Scott Peterson
 Parliamentary Secretary to the Minister of Labour
 4 March 1980 – 30 September 1980: Gilbert Parent
 26 May 1981 – 30 September 1981: Gilbert Parent
 Parliamentary Secretary to the Postmaster General
 4 March 1980 – 30 September 1980 Aideen Nicholson
 Parliamentary Secretary to the Minister of Transport
 1 March 1982 – 29 February 1984: Jesse Philip Flis
 Parliamentary Secretary to the Minister of State for Economic Development
 1 October 1982 – 30 September 1983: James Scott Peterson
 Parliamentary Secretary to the Minister of State for Science and Technology
 4 March 1980 – 30 September 1982: Roger Simmons
 1 October 1982 – 30 September 1983: James Scott Peterson
 Parliamentary Secretary to the Minister of State for Social Development
 1 October 1981 – 30 September 1982: James Scott Peterson
 Parliamentary Secretary to the Minister of State (Sports)
 4 March 1980 – 30 September 1980: Gilbert Parent
 26 May 1981 – 30 September 1981: Gilbert Parent
 1 October 1981 – 30 September 1982: Jean Lapierre
 Parliamentary Secretary to the President of the Privy Council
 4 March 1980 – 30 September 1981: David Michael Collenette
 1 October 1981 – 11 August 1983: David Paul Smith
 Parliamentary Secretary to the President of the Treasury Board
 1 October 1980 – 21 September 1981: Serge Joyal
 Parliamentary Secretary to the Secretary of State of Canada
 4 March 1980 – 1 July 1981: Peter Alan Stollery
 1 October 1981 – 30 September 1982: Jean Lapierre
 Parliamentary Secretary to the Secretary of State for External Affairs
 1 October 1982 – 30 September 1983: Jean Lapierre
 Parliamentary Secretary to the Solicitor General of Canada
 4 March 1980 – 28 February 1982: Céline Hervieux-Payette

Twenty-Third Canadian ministry 
 Parliamentary Secretary to the Minister of Energy, Mines and Resources
 30 June 1984 – 9 July 1984: Leonard Donald Hopkins

Twenty-Fourth Canadian ministry 
 Parliamentary Secretary to the Prime Minister
 1 November 1984 – 10 March 1993: Leonard Joe Gustafson
 11 March 1993 – 24 June 1993: André Harvey
 Parliamentary Secretary to the Minister of Communications
 31 January 1991 – 7 May 1991: Lee Richardson
 Parliamentary Secretary to the Minister for External Relations
 1 November 1984 – 24 November 1985: David Kilgour
 Parliamentary Secretary to the Minister of Indian Affairs and Northern Development
 25 November 1985 – 14 October 1986: David Kilgour
 Parliamentary Secretary to the Minister of Industry, Science and Technology
 5 April 1989 – 25 June 1990: Benoît Tremblay
 Parliamentary Secretary to the Minister of Justice and Attorney General of Canada
 5 April 1989 – 24 June 1993: Robert Douglas Nicholson
 Parliamentary Secretary to the Minister of Regional Industrial Expansion
 15 October 1985 – 4 April 1989: Michael Forrestall
 5 April 1989 – 4 April 1990: Benoît Tremblay
 Parliamentary Secretary to the Minister of Transport
 1 November 1984 – 14 October 1986: Michael Forrestall
 15 October 1986 – 6 April 1987: David Kilgour
 8 May 1991 – 24 June 1993: Lee Richardson
 Parliamentary Secretary to the Leader of the Government in the House of Commons
 5 April 1989 – 4 April 1990: Robert Douglas Nicholson
 Parliamentary Secretary to the Minister of State for Science and Technology
 15 October 1987 – 4 April 1989: Michael Forrestall
 5 April 1989 – 4 April 1990: Benoît Tremblay

Twenty-Fifth Canadian ministry 
 Parliamentary Secretary to the Minister of Indian Affairs and Northern Development
 1 September 1993 – 26 October 1993: André Harvey
 Parliamentary Secretary to the Minister of National Defence
 1 September 1993 – 26 October 1993: Jean-Pierre Blackburn
 Parliamentary Secretary to the Minister of Transport
 1 September 1993 – 26 October 1993: Lee Richardson

Twenty-Sixth Canadian ministry 
 Parliamentary Secretary to the Prime Minister
 6 December 1993 – 22 February 1996: Jean Magdalene Augustine
 23 February 1996 – 15 July 1998: Rey Pagtakhan
 16 July 1998 – 31 August 2000: Gar Knutson
 1 September 2000 – 12 January 2003: Joe Jordan
 13 January 2003 – 11 December 2003: Rodger Cuzner
 Parliamentary Secretary to the Deputy Prime Minister
 6 December 1993 – 22 February 1996: Clifford Lincoln
 23 February 1996 – 9 July 1997: Guy H. Arseneault
 8 April 2002 – 6 August 2002: Steve Mahoney
 Parliamentary Secretary to the Minister of Agriculture (Agriculture and Agri-Food)
 6 December 1993 – 11 January 1995: Lyle Vanclief
 Became Parliamentary Secretary to the Minister of Agriculture and Agri-Food.
 Parliamentary Secretary to the Minister of Agriculture and Agri-Food
 Was Parliamentary Secretary to the Minister of Agriculture (Agriculture and Agri-Food).
 12 January 1995 – 22 February 1996: Lyle Vanclief
 23 February 1996 – 9 July 1997: Jerry Pickard
 10 July 1997 – 15 July 1998: John Harvard
 16 July 1998 – 31 August 2000: Joseph McGuire
 1 September 2000 – 12 January 2003: Larry McCormick
 13 January 2003 – 11 December 2003: Claude Duplain
 Parliamentary Secretary to the Minister of Atlantic Canada Opportunities Agency
 23 February 1996 – 9 July 1997: Morris Peter Bodnar
 Parliamentary Secretary to the Minister of Canadian Heritage
 Was Parliamentary Secretary to the Minister of Communications (Canadian Heritage) and Parliamentary Secretary to the Minister of Multiculturalism and Citizenship (Canadian Heritage).
 12 July 1996 – 9 July 1997: Guy H. Arseneault
 10 July 1997 – 15 July 1998: John Ferguson Godfrey
 16 July 1998 – 31 August 2000: Mauril Bélanger
 1 September 2000 – 12 January 2003: Sarmite Bulte
 13 January 2003 – 11 December 2003: Carole-Marie Allard
 Parliamentary Secretary to the Minister of Citizenship and Immigration
 Was Parliamentary Secretary to the Secretary of State of Canada (Citizenship and Immigration)
 23 June 1994 – 22 February 1996: Mary Catherine Clancy
 23 February 1996 – 9 July 1997: Maria Minna
 10 July 1997 – 15 July 1998: Maria Minna
 16 July 1998 – 31 August 2000: Andrew Telegdi
 1 September 2000 – 12 January 2003: Mark Assad
 13 January 2003 – 11 December 2003: Sarkis Assadourian
 Parliamentary Secretary to the Minister of Communications (Canadian Heritage)
 6 December 1993 – 22 February 1996: Albina Guarnieri
 23 February 1996 – 11 July 1996: Guy H. Arseneault
 Became Parliamentary Secretary to the Minister of Canadian Heritage.
 Parliamentary Secretary to the Minister of Consumer and Corporate Affairs (Industry)
 6 December 1993 – 28 March 1995: Dennis Joseph Mills
 Became Parliamentary Secretary to the Minister of Industry.
 Parliamentary Secretary to the Minister of Employment and Immigration (Human Resources Development)
 6 December 1993 – 22 February 1996: Maurizio Bevilacqua
 23 February 1996 – 9 July 1997: Robert Daniel Nault
 Parliamentary Secretary to the Minister of Energy, Mines and Resources (Natural Resources)
 6 December 1993 – 11 January 1995: George Saunders Rideout
 Became Parliamentary Secretary to the Minister of Natural Resources.
 Parliamentary Secretary to the Minister of Environment
 6 December 1993 – 22 February 1996: Clifford Lincoln
 23 February 1996 – 15 July 1998: Karen Kraft Sloan
 16 July 1998 – 31 August 2000: Paddy Torsney
 1 September 2000 – 12 January 2003: Karen Redman
 13 January 2003 – 11 December 2003: Alan Tonks
 Parliamentary Secretary to the Minister of Finance
 6 December 1993 – 22 February 1994: David Walker
 23 February 1996 – 9 July 1997: Barry R. Campbell
 10 July 1997 – 31 August 1999: Tony Valeri
 1 September 1999 – 12 September 2001: Roy Cullen
 13 September 2001 – 14 January 2002: John McCallum
 19 February 2002 – 11 December 2003: Bryon Wilfert
 Parliamentary Secretary to the Minister of Fisheries and Oceans
 6 December 1993 – 22 February 1996: Herb Dhaliwal
 23 February 1996 – 9 July 1997: Edward Watson McWhinney
 10 July 1997 – 31 August 1999: Arnold Wayne Easter
 1 September 1999 – 12 September 2001: Lawrence O'Brien
 13 September 2001 – 11 December 2003: Georges Farrah
 Parliamentary Secretary to the Minister of Foreign Affairs
 Was Parliamentary Secretary to the Secretary of State for External Affairs (Foreign Affairs).
 13 May 1995 – 22 February 1996: Jesse Philip Flis
 23 February 1996 – 9 July 1997: Francis Gerard LeBlanc
 10 July 1997 – 15 July 1998: Edward Watson McWhinney
 16 July 1998 – 31 August 1999: Julian Reed
 1 September 1999 – 12 September 2001: Denis Paradis
 13 September 2001 – 11 December 2003: Aileen Carroll
 Parliamentary Secretary to the Minister of Forestry (Natural Resources)
 6 December 1993 – 11 January 1995: George Saunders Rideout
 Became Parliamentary Secretary to the Minister of Natural Resources.
 Parliamentary Secretary to the Minister of Health
 Was Parliamentary Secretary to the Minister of National Health and Welfare (Health).
 22 February 1997 – 15 July 1998: Joseph Volpe
 16 July 1998 – 15 July 1999: Elinor Caplan
 1 September 1999 – 12 September 2001: Yvon Charbonneau
 13 September 2001 – 11 December 2003: Jeannot Castonguay
 Parliamentary Secretary to the Minister of Human Resources Development
 12 July 1996 – 9 July 1997: George Albert Proud
 10 July 1997 – 15 July 1998: Robert Daniel Nault
 16 July 1998 – 31 August 2000: Bonnie Brown
 1 September 2000 – 12 January 2003: Raymonde Folco
 13 January 2003 – 11 December 2003: Diane St-Jacques
 Parliamentary Secretary to the Minister of Indian Affairs and Northern Development
 6 December 1993 – 22 February 1996: Jack Iyerak Anawak
 23 February 1996 – 15 July 1998: Bernard Patry
 16 July 1998 – 31 August 2000: David Iftody
 1 September 2000 – 12 January 2003: John Finlay
 13 January 2003 – 11 December 2003: Charles Hubbard
 Parliamentary Secretary to the Minister of Industry
 Was Parliamentary Secretary to the Minister of Consumer and Corporate Affairs (Industry) and Parliamentary Secretary to the Minister of Industry, Science and Technology (Industry).
 29 March 1995 – 22 February 1996: Dennis Joseph Mills
 23 February 1996 – 9 July 1997: Morris Peter Bodnar
 10 July 1997 – 31 August 1999: Walt Lastewka
 1 September 1999 – 12 September 2001: John Cannis
 13 September 2001 – 14 January 2002: Claude Drouin
 18 February 2002 – 12 December 2003: Serge Marcil
 Parliamentary Secretary to the Minister of Industry, Science and Technology (Industry)
 6 December 1993 – 28 March 1995: Dennis Joseph Mills
 Became Parliamentary Secretary to the Minister of Industry.
 Parliamentary Secretary to the Minister of International Cooperation
 23 February 1996 – 9 July 1997: John Ferguson Godfrey
 10 July 1997 – 22 November 1998: Claudette Bradshaw
 26 January 1999 – 31 August 1999: Denis Paradis
 1 September 1999 – 12 September 2001: Eugène Bellemare
 13 September 2001 – 12 January 2003: Marlene Jennings
 13 January 2003 – 11 December 2003: André Harvey
 Parliamentary Secretary to the Minister of International Trade
 6 December 1993 – 22 February 1996: Mac Harb
 23 February 1996 – 9 July 1997: Ron MacDonald
 10 July 1997 – 15 July 1998: Julian Reed
 16 July 1998 – 31 August 2000: Robert Speller
 1 September 2000 – 12 January 2003: Patrick O'Brien
 13 January 2003 – 11 December 2003: Murray Calder
 Parliamentary Secretary to the Minister of Justice and Attorney General of Canada
 6 December 1993 – 22 February 1996: Russell Gregoire MacLellan
 23 February 1996 – 9 July 1997: Gordon Kirkby
 10 July 1997 – 31 August 1999: Eleni Bakopanos
 1 September 1999 – 12 September 2001: John Maloney
 13 September 2001 – 14 January 2002: Stephen Owen
 18 February 2002 – 12 December 2003: Paul Macklin
 Parliamentary Secretary to the Minister of Labour
 Was Parliamentary Secretary to the Minister of Labour (Human Resources Development).
 1 September 1999 – 12 September 2001: Judi Longfield
 13 September 2001 – 11 December 2003: Gurbax Malhi
 Parliamentary Secretary to the Minister of Labour (Human Resources Development)
 6 December 1993 – 5 September 1995: Maurizio Bevilacqua
 6 September 1995 – 22 February 1996: Robert Daniel Nault
 23 February 1996 – 11 July 1996: George Albert Proud
 22 February 1997 – 9 July 1997: George Albert Proud
 10 July 1997 – 31 August 1999: Brenda Chamberlain
Became Parliamentary Secretary to the Minister of Labour.
 Parliamentary Secretary to the Minister of Multiculturalism and Citizenship (Canadian Heritage)
 6 December 1993 – 22 February 1996: Albina Guarnieri
 23 February 1996 – 11 July 1996: Guy H. Arseneault
 Became Parliamentary Secretary to the Minister of Canadian Heritage.
 Parliamentary Secretary to the Minister of National Defence
 6 December 1993 – 22 February 1996: Fred J. Mifflin
 23 February 1996 – 15 July 1998: John Richardson
 16 July 1998 – 31 August 2000: Robert Bertrand
 1 September 2000 – 21 December 2000: Hector Clouthier
 22 December 2000 – 13 December 2002: John O'Reilly
 Parliamentary Secretary to the Minister of National Health and Welfare (Health)
 6 December 1993 – 22 February 1996: Hedy Fry
 23 February 1996 – 21 February 1997: Joseph Volpe
 Became Parliamentary Secretary to the Minister of Health.
 Parliamentary Secretary to the Minister of National Revenue
 6 December 1993 – 22 February 1996: Susan Whelan
 23 February 1996 – 15 July 1998: Susan Carol Barnes
 16 July 1998 – 31 August 2000: Beth Phinney
 1 September 2000 – 12 January 2003: Sophia Leung
 13 January 2003 – 11 December 2003: Colleen Beaumier
 Parliamentary Secretary to the Minister of Natural Resources
 Parliamentary Secretary to the Minister of Energy, Mines and Resources (Natural Resources) and Parliamentary Secretary to the Minister of Forestry (Natural Resources).
 12 January 1995 – 22 February 1996: George Saunders Rideout
 23 February 1996 – 9 July 1997: Marlene Cowling
 10 July 1997 – 31 August 1999: Gerry Byrne
 1 September 1999 – 31 August 2000: Brent St. Denis
 1 September 2000 – 12 January 2003: Benoît Serré
 13 January 2003 – 11 December 2003: Nancy Karetak-Lindell
 Parliamentary Secretary to the Minister of Public Works (Public Works and Government Services)
 6 December 1993 – 5 December 1994: Ronald J. Duhamel
 6 December 1994 – 22 February 1996: Réginald Bélair
 23 February 1996 – 21 February 1997: John Harvard
 Became Parliamentary Secretary to the Minister of Public Works and Government Services.
 Parliamentary Secretary to the Minister of Public Works and Government Services
 Was Parliamentary Secretary to the Minister of Public Works (Public Works and Government Services) and Parliamentary Secretary to the Minister of Supply and Services (Public Works and Government Services).
 22 February 1997 – 9 July 1997: John Harvard
 10 July 1997 – 15 July 1998: Jerry Pickard
 16 July 1998 – 31 August 2000: Carolyn Parrish
 1 September 2000 – 12 January 2003: Paul Szabo
 13 January 2003 – 11 December 2003: Judy Sgro
 Parliamentary Secretary to the Minister of Supply and Services (Public Works and Government Services)
 6 December 1993 – 5 December 1994: Ronald J. Duhamel
 6 December 1994 – 22 February 1996: Réginald Bélair
 23 February 1996 – 21 February 1997: John Harvard
 Became Parliamentary Secretary to the Minister of Public Works and Government Services.
 Parliamentary Secretary to the Minister of Transport
 6 December 1993 – 22 February 1996: Joseph Frank Fontana
 23 February 1996 – 15 July 1998: Stan Kazmierczak Keyes
 16 July 1998 – 31 August 2000: Stanley Dromisky
 1 September 2000 – 12 September 2001: Brent St. Denis
 13 September 2001 – 12 January 2003: André Harvey
 13 January 2003 – 11 December 2003: Marcel Proulx
 Parliamentary Secretary to the Minister of Transport for Crown Corporations
 7 August 2002 – 10 April 2003: Steve Mahoney
 Parliamentary Secretary to the Minister of Veterans Affairs
 6 December 1993 – 22 February 1996: Fred J. Mifflin
 23 February 1996 – 9 July 1997: John Richardson
 10 July 1997 – 15 July 1998: George Albert Proud
 16 July 1998 – 31 August 2000: Bob Wood
 1 September 2000 – 12 January 2003: Carmen Provenzano
 13 January 2003 – 11 December 2003: Ivan Grose
 Parliamentary Secretary to the Minister of Western Economic Diversification
 23 February 1996 – 9 July 1997: Morris Peter Bodnar
 Parliamentary Secretary to the Minister responsible for La Francophonie
 10 July 1997 – 22 November 1998: Claudette Bradshaw
 26 January 1999 – 15 July 1999: Denis Paradis
 Parliamentary Secretary to the President of the Queen's Privy Council for Canada and Minister of Intergovernmental Affairs
 Was Parliamentary Secretary to the President of the Privy Council.
 23 February 1996 – 15 July 1998: Paul DeVillers
 16 July 1998 – 31 August 2000: Reg Alcock
 1 September 2000 – 12 January 2003: Bill Matthews
 13 January 2003 – 11 December 2003: Joe Peschisolido
 Parliamentary Secretary to the President of the Privy Council
 6 December 1993 – 22 February 1996: John English
 Became Parliamentary Secretary to the President of the Queen's Privy Council for Canada and Minister of Intergovernmental Affairs.
 Parliamentary Secretary to the President of the Treasury Board
 6 December 1993 – 26 September 1994: Marlene Catterall
 6 December 1994 – 22 February 1996: Ronald J. Duhamel
 23 February 1996 – 15 July 1998: Ovid L. Jackson
 16 July 1998 – 31 August 2000: Tony Ianno
 1 September 2000 – 12 January 2003: Alex Shepherd
 13 January 2003 – 11 December 2003: Tony Tirabassi
 Parliamentary Secretary to the Secretary of State of Canada (Citizenship and Immigration)
 6 December 1993 – 22 June 1994: Mary Catherine Clancy
 Became Parliamentary Secretary to the Minister of Citizenship and Immigration.
 Parliamentary Secretary to the Secretary of State for External Affairs (Foreign Affairs)
 6 December 1993 – 12 May 1995: Jesse Philip Flis
 Became Parliamentary Secretary to the Minister of Foreign Affairs.
 Parliamentary Secretary to the Solicitor General of Canada
 6 December 1993 – 22 February 1996: Patrick Gagnon
 23 February 1996 – 15 July 1998: Nick Discepola
 16 July 1998 – 31 August 2000: Jacques Saada
 1 September 2000 – 12 January 2003: Lynn Myers
 13 January 2003 – 11 December 2003: Marlene Jennings
 Parliamentary Secretary to the Leader of the Government in the House of Commons
 6 December 1993 – 22 February 1996: Peter Andrew Stewart Milliken
 23 February 1996 – 9 July 1997: Paul Zed
 10 July 1997 – 31 August 1999: Peter Adams
 1 September 1999 – 12 September 2001: Derek Vincent Lee
 13 September 2001 – 11 December 2003: Geoff Regan

Twenty-Seventh Canadian ministry 
 Parliamentary Secretary to the Prime Minister
 12 May 2005 – 6 October 2005: Paul DeVillers
 7 October 2005 – 5 February 2006: Navdeen Singh Bains
 Parliamentary Secretary to the Prime Minister with special emphasis on Aboriginal Affairs
 30 January 2004 – 19 July 2004: Andrew Telegdi
 Parliamentary Secretary to the Prime Minister with special emphasis on Canada–U.S. relations
 12 December 2003 – 19 July 2004: Scott Brison
 20 July 2004 – 6 October 2005: Marlene Jennings
 Parliamentary Secretary to the Prime Minister with special emphasis on Cities
 12 December 2003 – 19 July 2004: John Ferguson Godfrey
 Parliamentary Secretary to the Prime Minister with special emphasis on Rural Communities
 20 July 2004 – 5 February 2006: Claude Drouin
 Parliamentary Secretary to the Prime Minister with special emphasis on Science and Small Business
 12 December 2003 – 19 July 2004: Joe Fontana
 Parliamentary Secretary to the Deputy Prime Minister and Minister of Public Safety and Emergency Preparedness with special emphasis on Emergency Preparedness
 12 December 2003 – 19 July 2004: Yvon Charbonneau
 Parliamentary Secretary to the Deputy Prime Minister and Minister of Public Safety and Emergency Preparedness with special emphasis on Border Transit
 12 December 2003 – 19 July 2004: Jerry Pickard
 Parliamentary Secretary to the Minister of Agriculture and Agri-Food with special emphasis on Agri-Food
 12 December 2003 – 19 July 2004: Mark Eyking
 Parliamentary Secretary to the Minister of Agriculture and Agri-Food with special emphasis on Rural Development
 12 October 2003 – 19 July 2004: Georges Farrah
 20 July 2004 – 5 February 2006: Arnold Wayne Easter
 Parliamentary Secretary to the Minister of Canadian Heritage
 20 July 2004 – 5 February 2006: Sarmite D. Bulte
 Parliamentary Secretary to the Minister of Canadian Heritage and Minister responsible for the Status of Women with special emphasis on status of women
 7 October 2005 – 5 February 2006: Anita Neville
 Parliamentary Secretary to the Minister of Citizenship and Immigration
 20 July 2004 – 5 February 2006: Hedy Fry
 Parliamentary Secretary to the Minister of Citizenship and Immigration with special emphasis on Foreign Credentials
 12 December 2003 – 19 July 2004: Hedy Fry
 Parliamentary Secretary to the Minister of the Environment
 20 July 2004 – 5 February 2006: Bryon Wilfert
 Parliamentary Secretary to the Minister of the Environment with special emphasis on Parks
 12 December 2003 – 19 July 2004: Serge Marcil
 Parliamentary Secretary to the Minister of Finance
 20 July 2004 – 5 February 2006: John Norman McKay
 Parliamentary Secretary to the Minister of Finance with special emphasis on Public Private Partnerships
 12 December 2003 – 19 July 2004: John Norman McKay
 Parliamentary Secretary to the Minister of Fisheries and Oceans
 20 July 2004 – 5 February 2006: Shawn Murphy
 Parliamentary Secretary to the Minister of Fisheries and Oceans with special emphasis on the Oceans Action Plan
 12 December 2003 – 19 July 2004: Shawn Murphy
 Parliamentary Secretary to the Minister of Foreign Affairs
 20 July 2004 – 5 February 2006: Dan McTeague
 Parliamentary Secretary to the Minister of Foreign Affairs with special emphasis on Canadians Abroad
 12 December 2003 – 19 July 2004: Dan McTeague
 Parliamentary Secretary to the Minister of Health
 20 July 2004 – 5 February 2006: Robert Thibault
 Parliamentary Secretary to the Minister of Health with special emphasis on Drug Review Agency
 12 December 2003 – 19 July 2004: Gerry Byrne
 Parliamentary Secretary to the Minister of Human Resources and Skills Development
 20 July 2004 – 19 July 2005: Peter Adams
 20 July 2004 – 29 May 2005: Gurbax Singh Malhi
 7 October 2005 – 5 February 2006: Peter Adams
 Parliamentary Secretary to the Minister of Human Resources and Skills Development with special emphasis on the Internationally Trained Workers Initiative
 20 July 2004 – 5 February 2006: Hedy Fry
 Parliamentary Secretary to the Minister of Human Resources and Skills Development with special emphasis on Social Economy
 12 December 2003 – 19 July 2004: Eleni Bakopanos
 Parliamentary Secretary to the Minister of Human Resources and Skills Development with special emphasis on Student Loans
 12 December 2003 – 19 July 2004: Paul Bonwick
 Parliamentary Secretary to the Minister of Human Resources and Skills Development and Minister responsible for Democratic Renewal
 30 May 2005 – 6 October 2005: Gurbax Singh Malhi
 20 July 2005 – 6 October 2005: Peter Adams
 7 October 2005 – 5 February 2006: Jim Karygiannis
 Parliamentary Secretary to the Minister of Indian Affairs and Northern Development with special emphasis on Northern Economic Development
 12 December 2003 – 19 July 2004: Larry Bagnell
 Parliamentary Secretary to the Minister of Indian Affairs and Northern Development and Federal Interlocutor for Métis and Non-Status Indians
 20 July 2004 – 5 February 2006: Sue Barnes
 Parliamentary Secretary to the Minister of Industry
 20 July 2004 – 5 February 2006: Jerry Pickard
 Parliamentary Secretary to the Minister of Industry, with special emphasis on Women Entrepreneurs
 19 October 2005 – 5 February 2006: Sarmite D. Bulte
 Parliamentary Secretary to the Minister of Intergovernmental Affairs
 20 July 2004 – 5 February 2006: Gerry Byrne
 Parliamentary Secretary to the Minister for Internal Trade, Deputy Leader of the Government in the House of Commons and Minister responsible for Official Languages
 20 July 2005 – 5 February 2006: Raymond Simard
 Parliamentary Secretary to the Minister for International Cooperation
 20 July 2004 – 5 February 2006: Paddy Torsney
 Parliamentary Secretary to the Minister for International Trade with special emphasis on Emerging Markets
 20 July 2004 – 5 February 2006: Mark Eyking
 Parliamentary Secretary to the Minister for International Trade with special emphasis on Resource Promotion
 12 December 2003 – 6 May 2004: John Harvard
 Parliamentary Secretary to the Minister of Justice and Attorney General of Canada
 20 July 2004 – 5 February 2006: Paul Harold Macklin
 Parliamentary Secretary to the Minister of Justice and Attorney General of Canada with special emphasis on Judicial Transparency and Aboriginal Justice
 12 December 2003 – 19 July 2004: Sue Barnes
 Parliamentary Secretary to the Minister of Labour and Housing
 20 July 2004 – 5 February 2006: Judi Longfield
 Parliamentary Secretary to the Minister of National Defence
 20 July 2004 – 5 February 2006: Keith P. Martin
 Parliamentary Secretary to the Minister of National Defence with special emphasis on the Role of the Reserves
 12 December 2003 – 19 July 2004: David Price
 Parliamentary Secretary to the Minister of National Revenue
 7 July 2005 – 5 February 2006: Gurbax Singh Malhi
 Parliamentary Secretary to the Minister of Natural Resources
 20 July 2004 – 5 February 2006: Larry Bagnell
 Parliamentary Secretary to the Minister of Natural Resources with special emphasis on Development of Value-Added Industries
 12 December 2003 – 19 July 2004: André Harvey
 Parliamentary Secretary to the Minister of Public Safety and Emergency Preparedness
 20 July 2004 – 5 February 2006: Roy Cullen
 Parliamentary Secretary to the Minister of Public Works and Government Services
 20 July 2004 – 5 February 2006: Walt Lastewka
 Parliamentary Secretary to the Minister of Public Works and Government Services with special emphasis on Procurement Review
 12 December 2003 – 19 July 2004: Walt Lastewka
 Parliamentary Secretary to the Minister of Social Development with special emphasis on Social Economy
 20 July 2004 – 5 February 2006: Eleni Bakopanos
 Parliamentary Secretary to the Minister of Transport
 20 July 2004 – 6 October 2005: Jim Karygiannis
 7 October 2005 – 5 February 2006: Charles Hubbard
 Parliamentary Secretary to the Minister of Transport with special emphasis on Transport and Environment
 12 December 2003 – 19 July 2004: Jim Karygiannis
 Parliamentary Secretary to the Minister responsible for the Status of Women
 20 July 2004 – 5 February 2006: Sarmite D. Bulte
 Parliamentary Secretary to the President of the Queen’s Privy Council for Canada with special emphasis on Public Service Reform and Métis and Non-Status Indians
 12 December 2003 – 19 July 2004: Brenda Chamberlain
 Parliamentary Secretary to the President of the Treasury Board with special emphasis on Regulatory Reform
 12 December 2003 – 19 July 2004: Joe Louis Jordan
 Parliamentary Secretary to the President of the Treasury Board and Minister responsible for the Canadian Wheat Board
 20 July 2004 – 5 February 2006: Diane Marleau
 Parliamentary Secretary to the Leader of the Government in the House of Commons
 20 July 2004 – 5 February 2006: Dominic LeBlanc
 Parliamentary Secretary to the Leader of the Government in the House of Commons with special emphasis on Democratic Reform
 12 December 2003 – 19 July 2004: Roger John Gallaway
 Parliamentary Secretary to the Minister of Industry with special emphasis on Entrepreneurs and New Canadians
 12 December 2003 – 19 July 2004: Gurbax Singh Malhi
 Parliamentary Secretary to the Deputy Leader of the Government in the House of Commons, Minister responsible for Official Languages and Minister responsible for Democratic Reform
 20 July 2004 – 19 July 2005: Raymond Simard

Twenty-Eighth Canadian ministry 
 Parliamentary Secretary to the Prime Minister
 7 February 2006 – 19 October 2015: Sylvie Boucher
 7 February 2006 – 19 October 2015: Jason Kenney
 Parliamentary Secretary to the Minister of Agriculture and Agri-Food and Minister for the Canadian Wheat Board
 7 February 2006 – 19 October 2015: Jacques Gourde
 Parliamentary Secretary (for the Canadian Wheat Board) to the Minister of Agriculture and Agri-Food and Minister for the Canadian Wheat Board
 7 February 2006 – 19 October 2015: David L. Anderson
 Parliamentary Secretary to the Minister of Canadian Heritage
 7 February 2006 – 19 October 2015: James Abbott
 Parliamentary Secretary to the Minister of Citizenship and Immigration
 7 February 2006 – 19 October 2015: Ed Komarnicki
 Parliamentary Secretary to the Minister of the Environment
 7 February 2006 – 19 October 2015: Mark Warawa
 Parliamentary Secretary to the Minister of Finance
 7 February 2006 – 19 October 2015: Diane Ablonczy
 Parliamentary Secretary to the Minister of Fisheries and Oceans
 7 February 2006 – 19 October 2015: Randy Kamp
 Parliamentary Secretary to the Minister of Foreign Affairs
 7 February 2006 – 19 October 2015: Deepak Obhrai
 Parliamentary Secretary to the Minister of Health
 7 February 2006 – 19 October 2015: Steven John Fletcher
 Parliamentary Secretary to the Minister of Human Resources and Social Development
 7 February 2006 – 19 October 2015: Lynne Yelich
 Parliamentary Secretary to the Minister of Indian Affairs and Northern Development and Federal Interlocutor for Métis and Non-Status Indians
 7 February 2006 – 19 October 2015: Rod Bruinooge
 Parliamentary Secretary to the Minister of Industry
 7 February 2006 – 19 October 2015: Colin Carrie
 Parliamentary Secretary to the Minister for International Cooperation
 7 February 2006 – 19 October 2015: Ted Menzies
 Parliamentary Secretary to the Minister for International Trade
 7 February 2006 – 19 October 2015: Helena Guergis
 Parliamentary Secretary to the Minister of Justice and Attorney General of Canada
 7 February 2006 – 19 October 2015: Rob Moore
 Parliamentary Secretary to the Minister for La Francophonie and Official Languages
 7 February 2006 – 19 October 2015: Sylvie Boucher
 Parliamentary Secretary to the Minister of National Defence
 7 February 2006 – 19 October 2015: Russ Hiebert
 Parliamentary Secretary to the Minister of Natural Resources
 7 February 2006 – 19 October 2015: Christian Paradis
 Parliamentary Secretary to the Minister for the Pacific Gateway and the Vancouver-Whistler Olympics
 10 April 2006 – 19 October 2015: James Moore
 Parliamentary Secretary to the Minister of Public Safety
 7 February 2006 – 19 October 2015: Dave MacKenzie
 Parliamentary Secretary to the Minister of Public Works and Government Services
 7 February 2006 – 19 October 2015: James Moore
 Parliamentary Secretary to the Minister of Transport, Infrastructure and Communities
 7 February 2006 – 19 October 2015: Brian Jean
 Parliamentary Secretary to the Minister of Veterans Affairs
 7 February 2006 – 19 October 2015: Betty Hinton
 Parliamentary Secretary to the President of the Treasury Board
 7 February 2006 – 19 October 2015: Pierre Poilievre
 Parliamentary Secretary to the Leader of the Government in the House of Commons and Minister for Democratic Reform
 7 February 2006 – 19 October 2015: Tom Lukiwski

Twenty-Ninth Canadian ministry 

 Parliamentary Secretary to the Prime Minister
 2 December 2015 – 27 January 2017: Celina Caesar-Chavannes
 2 December 2015 – 27 January 2017: Adam Vaughan (Intergovernmental Affairs)
 2 December 2015 – 31 August 2018: Peter Schiefke (Youth)
 Parliamentary Secretary to the Minister of Public Safety and Emergency Preparedness
 2 December 2015 – 27 January 2017: Michel Picard
 30 January 2017 – 31 August 2018: Mark Holland
 31 August 2018 – 11 September 2019: Karen McCrimmon
 Parliamentary Secretary to the Minister of Agriculture and Agri-Food 
 2 December 2015 – 11 September 2019: Jean-Claude Poissant
 Parliamentary Secretary to the Minister of Foreign Affairs
 2 December 2015 – 27 January 2017: Pamela Goldsmith-Jones
 30 January 2017 – 31 August 2018: Matt DeCourcey
 31 August 2018 – 11 September 2019: Andrew Leslie
 Parliamentary Secretary to the Minister of Foreign Affairs (Canada–U.S. relations)
 30 January 2017 – 11 September 2019: Andrew Leslie
 Parliamentary Secretary to the Minister of Foreign Affairs (Consular Affairs)
 2 December 2015 – 31 August 2018: Omar Alghabra
 31 August 2018 – 11 September 2019: Pamela Goldsmith-Jones
 Parliamentary Secretary to the Minister of Immigration, Refugees and Citizenship
 2 December 2015 – 27 January 2017: Arif Virani
 30 January 2017 – 31 August 2018: Serge Cormier
 31 August 2018 — 11 September 2019: Matt DeCourcey
 Parliamentary Secretary to the Minister of Indigenous and Northern Affairs
 2 December 2015 – 19 September 2017: Yvonne Jones
 Parliamentary Secretary to the President of the Treasury Board 
 2 December 2015 – 11 September 2019: Joyce Murray
 Parliamentary Secretary to the Leader of the Government in the House of Commons
 2 December 2015 – 11 September 2019: Kevin Lamoureux
 Parliamentary Secretary to the Minister of Innovation, Science and Economic Development 
 2 December 2015 – 27 January 2017: Greg Fergus
 30 January 2017 – 11 September 2019: David Lametti
 Parliamentary Secretary for Science
 2 December 2015 – 27 January 2017: Terry Beech
 30 January 2017 – 11 September 2019: Kate Young
 Parliamentary Secretary for Small Business and Tourism 
 2 December 2015 – 19 September 2017: Gudie Hutchings
 19 September 2017 – 11 September 2019: Alaina Lockhart
 Parliamentary Secretary to the Minister of Finance
 2 December 2015 – 10 January 2017: François-Philippe Champagne
 30 January 2017 – 28 August 2017: Ginette Petitpas Taylor
 19 September 2017 – 11 September 2019: Joël Lightbound
 Parliamentary Secretary to the Minister of Justice and Attorney General of Canada
 2 December 2015 – 27 January 2017: Sean Casey
 2 December 2015 – 18 July 2018: Bill Blair
 30 January 2017 – 31 August 2018: Marco Mendicino
 31 August 2018 – 11 September 2019: Arif Virani
 Parliamentary Secretary to the Minister of Public Services and Procurement
 2 December 2015 – 27 January 2017: Leona Alleslev
 30 January 2017 – 11 September 2019: Steven MacKinnon
 Parliamentary Secretary to the Minister of International Trade
 2 December 2015 – 27 January 2017: David Lametti
 30 January 2017 – 31 August 2018: Pamela Goldsmith-Jones
 31 August 2018 — 11 September 2019: Omar Alghabra
 Parliamentary Secretary to the Minister of Health
 2 December 2015 – 27 January 2017: Kamal Khera
 30 January 2017 – 19 September 2017: Joël Lightbound
 19 September 2017 – 18 July 2018: Bill Blair
 31 August 2018 — 11 September 2019: John Oliver
 Parliamentary Secretary to the Minister of Families, Children and Social Development
 2 December 2015 – 27 January 2017: Terry Duguid
 Parliamentary Secretary to the Minister of Families, Children and Social Development (Housing and Urban Affairs)
 30 January 2017 – 11 September 2019: Adam Vaughan
 Parliamentary Secretary to the Minister of Transport
 2 December 2015 – 27 January 2017: Kate Young
 30 January 2017 – 31 August 2018: Karen McCrimmon
 31 August 2018 – 11 September 2019: Terry Beech
 Parliamentary Secretary to the Minister of International Development
 2 December 2015 – 10 January 2017: Karina Gould
 30 January 2017 – 31 August 2018: Celina Caesar-Chavannes
 31 August 2018 — 11 September 2019: Kamal Khera
 Parliamentary Secretary to the Minister of Natural Resources
 2 December 2015 – 31 August 2018: Kim Rudd
 31 August 2018 – 11 September 2019: Paul Lefebvre
 Parliamentary Secretary to the Minister of Canadian Heritage 
 2 December 2015 – 27 January 2017: Randy Boissonnault
 30 January 2017 – 31 August 2018: Sean Casey
 31 August 2018 – 11 September 2019: Andy Fillmore
 Parliamentary Secretary to the Minister of Canadian Heritage (Multiculturalism)
 30 January 2017 – 31 August 2018: Arif Virani
 31 August 2018 — 11 September 2019: Gary Anandasangaree
 Parliamentary Secretary for Sport and Persons with Disabilities
 2 December 2015 – 31 August 2018: Stéphane Lauzon
 31 August 2018 — 11 September 2019: Kate Young
 Parliamentary Secretary for Status of Women
 2 December 2015 – 27 January 2017: Anju Dhillon
 30 January 2017 – 11 September 2019: Terry Duguid
 Parliamentary Secretary to the Minister of National Revenue 
 2 December 2015 – 27 January 2017: Emmanuel Dubourg
 30 January 2017 – 31 August 2018: Kamal Khera
 31 August 2018 — 11 September 2019: Deb Schulte
 Parliamentary Secretary to the Minister of Veterans Affairs and Associate Minister of National Defence
 2 December 2015 – 27 January 2017: Karen McCrimmon
 30 January 2017 – 31 August 2018: Sherry Romanado
 31 August 2018 — 11 September 2019: Stéphane Lauzon
 Parliamentary Secretary to the Minister of Environment and Climate Change
 2 December 2015 – 18 July 2018: Jonathan Wilkinson
 31 August 2018 — 11 September 2019: Sean Fraser
 Parliamentary Secretary to the Minister of National Defence
 2 December 2015 – 27 January 2017: John McKay
 30 January 2017 – 31 August 2018: Jean Rioux
 31 August 2018 — 11 September 2019: Serge Cormier
 Parliamentary Secretary to the Minister of Employment, Workforce Development and Labour
 2 December 2015 – 11 September 2019: Rodger Cuzner
 Parliamentary Secretary to the Minister of Infrastructure and Communities 
 2 December 2015 – 27 January 2017: Pablo Rodriguez
 30 January 2017 – 31 August 2018: Marc Miller
 31 August 2018 — 11 September 2019: Marco Mendicino
 Parliamentary Secretary to the Minister of Democratic Institutions
 2 December 2015 – 27 January 2017: Mark Holland
 30 January 2017 – 31 August 2018: Andy Fillmore
 31 August 2018 — 11 September 2019: Bernadette Jordan
 Parliamentary Secretary to the Minister of Fisheries, Oceans and the Canadian Coast Guard
 2 December 2015 – 27 January 2017: Serge Cormier
 30 January 2017 – 11 September 2019: Terry Beech
 Parliamentary Secretary to the Minister of Crown-Indigenous Relations
 19 September 2017 — 31 August 2018: Yvonne Jones
 31 August 2018 — 11 September 2019: Marc Miller
 Parliamentary Secretary to the Minister of Indigenous Services
 19 September 2017 – 31 August 2018: Don Rusnak
 31 August 2018 — 11 September 2019: Dan Vandal
 Parliamentary Secretary to the Minister of Intergovernmental and Northern Affairs and Internal Trade
 31 August 2018 — 11 September 2019: Yvonne Jones
 Parliamentary Secretary to the Minister of Seniors
 31 August 2018 — 11 September 2019: Sherry Romanado
 Parliamentary Secretary to the Minister of Border Security and Organized Crime Reduction
 31 August 2018 — 11 September 2019: Peter Schiefke

Thirtieth Canadian ministry

 Parliamentary Secretary to the Prime Minister (Public Service Renewal) and to the Deputy Prime Minister and Minister of Intergovernmental Affairs
 12 December 2019 – 12 January 2021: Omar Alghabra
 Parliamentary Secretary to Minister of Innovation, Science and Industry (Science)
 12 December 2019 – Present: Will Amos
 Parliamentary Secretary to the Minister of Crown-Indigenous Relations
 12 December 2019 – Present: Gary Anandasangaree
 Parliamentary Secretary to the Minister of Economic Development and Official Languages (Atlantic Canada Opportunities Agency and Official Languages)
 12 December 2019 – Present: René Arseneault
 Parliamentary Secretary to the Minister of Economic Development and Official Languages (Canadian Northern Economic Development Agency)
 12 December 2019 – Present: Larry Bagnell
Parliamentary Secretary to the Minister of Fisheries, Oceans and the Canadian Coast Guard
12 December 2019 – Present: Terry Beech
Parliamentary Secretary to the Minister of Small Business, Export Promotion and International Trade
12 December 2019 – Present: Rachel Bendayan
 Parliamentary Secretary to the Minister of Transport
 12 December 2019 – Present: Chris Bittle
 Parliamentary Secretary to the Minister of Canadian Heritage
 12 December 2019 – Present: Julie Dabrusin
 Parliamentary Secretary to the Minister of Indigenous Services
 12 December 2019 – Present: Pam Damoff
 Parliamentary Secretary to the Minister of Innovation, Science and Industry (Innovation and Industry)
 12 December 2019 – Present: Ali Ehsassi
 Parliamentary Secretary to the Minister of Agriculture and Agri-Food
 12 December 2019 – Present: Neil Ellis
 Parliamentary Secretary to the President of the Treasury Board and Parliamentary Secretary to the Minister of Digital Government
 12 December 2019 – Present: Greg Fergus
 Parliamentary Secretary to the Minister of Infrastructure and Communities
 12 December 2019 – Present: Andy Fillmore
 Parliamentary Secretary to the Minister of Health
 12 December 2019 – Present: Darren Fisher
 Parliamentary Secretary to the Minister of Finance and Parliamentary Secretary to the Minister of Middle Class Prosperity and Associate Minister of Finance
 12 December 2019 – Present: Sean Fraser
 Parliamentary Secretary to the Minister of Labour
 12 December 2019 – Present: Anthony Housefather
 Parliamentary Secretary to the Minister for Women and Gender Equality and Rural Economic Development
 12 December 2019 – Present: Gudie Hutchings
 Parliamentary Secretary to the Minister of Northern Affairs
 12 December 2019 – Present: Yvonne Jones
 Parliamentary Secretary to the Minister of International Development
 12 December 2019 – Present: Kamal Khera
 Parliamentary Secretary to the Minister of Employment, Workforce Development and Disability Inclusion
 12 December 2019 – Present: Irek Kusmierczyk
 Parliamentary Secretary to the President of the Queen’s Privy Council for Canada and Parliamentary Secretary to the Leader of the Government in the House of Commons
 12 December 2019 – Present: Kevin Lamoureux
 Parliamentary Secretary to the Minister of Seniors
 12 December 2019 – Present: Stéphane Lauzon
 Parliamentary Secretary to the Minister of Natural Resources
 12 December 2019 – Present: Paul Lefebvre
 Parliamentary Secretary to the Minister of Public Safety and Emergency Preparedness
 12 December 2019 – Present: Joël Lightbound
 Parliamentary Secretary to the Minister of Public Services and Procurement
 12 December 2019 – Present: Steven MacKinnon
 Parliamentary Secretary to the Minister of Immigration, Refugees and Citizenship
 12 December 2019 – Present: Soraya Martinez Ferrada
 Parliamentary Secretary to the Minister of Foreign Affairs
 12 December 2019 – Present: Rob Oliphant
 Parliamentary Secretary to the Minister of Veterans Affairs and Associate Minister of National Defence
 12 December 2019 – Present: Darrell Samson
 Parliamentary Secretary to the Minister of Environment and Climate Change
 12 December 2019 – Present: Peter Schiefke
 Parliamentary Secretary to the Minister of National Revenue
 12 December 2019 – Present: Francesco Sorbara
 Parliamentary Secretary to the Minister of Diversity and Inclusion and Youth and Parliamentary Secretary to the Minister of Canadian Heritage (Sport)
 12 December 2019 – Present: Adam van Koeverden
 Parliamentary Secretary to the Minister of National Defence
 12 December 2019 – Present: Anita Vandenbeld
 Parliamentary Secretary to the Minister of Families, Children and Social Development (Housing)
 12 December 2019 – Present: Adam Vaughan
 Parliamentary Secretary to the Minister of Justice and Attorney General of Canada
 12 December 2019 – Present: Arif Virani
 Parliamentary Secretary to the Minister of Economic Development and Official Languages (Atlantic Canada Opportunities Agency and Official Languages)
 12 December 2019 – Present: René Arseneault
 Parliamentary Secretary to the Minister of Economic Development and Official Languages (Canadian Northern Economic Development Agency)
 12 December 2019 – Present: Larry Bagnell
 Parliamentary Secretary to the Minister of Economic Development and Official Languages (Economic Development Agency of Canada for the Regions of Quebec)
 12 December 2019 – Present: Élisabeth Brière
 Parliamentary Secretary to the Minister of Economic Development and Official Languages (Western Economic Diversification Canada) and Parliamentary Secretary to the Minister of Environment and Climate Change (Canada Water Agency)
 12 December 2019 – Present: Terry Duguid
 Parliamentary Secretary to the Minister of Economic Development and Official Languages (FedNor)
 12 December 2019 – Present: Terry Sheehan
 Parliamentary Secretary to the Minister of Economic Development and Official Languages (FedDev Ontario)
 12 December 2019 – Present: Kate Young

References

Parliamentary Secretaries of Canada